The Imaging Science Journal, formerly The Journal of Photographic Science, is a bimonthly peer-reviewed scientific journal covering both fundamental and applied aspects of imaging, including conventional, analogue chemical, electronic, digital and hybrid imaging systems. It is an official journal of the Royal Photographic Society and published by Taylor & Francis, previously published by Maney Publishing. The journal was established in 1953. The current editor-in-chief is Professor Ricardo Vardasca, from ISLA Santarém, Portugal.

References

External links 
 
 Print: 
 Online: 

English-language journals
Bimonthly journals
Computer science in the United Kingdom
Computer science journals
Imaging
Optics journals
Publications established in 1953
Taylor & Francis academic journals
Academic journals associated with learned and professional societies of the United Kingdom